Richard P. Nathan (24 November 24, 1935 - 12 September 2021) was the former director of the Rockefeller Institute of Government and the Distinguished Professor of Political Science and Public Policy at the State University of New York at Albany.  Nathan has written and edited books on the implementation of domestic public program in the United States and on American federalism. Prior to coming to Albany, he was a professor at Princeton University, the Woodrow Wilson School of Public and International Affairs.  He served in the federal government as assistant director of the U.S. Office of Management and Budget, deputy undersecretary for welfare reform of the U.S. Department of Health Education and Welfare (now U.S. Department of Health and Human Services), and director of domestic policy for the National Commission on Civil Disorders (the Kerner Commission).

External links
 Richard Nathan
 Rockefeller Institute of Government
 

Living people
University at Albany, SUNY faculty
1935 births